Dubrovčan  is a village in Croatia. It is connected by the D205 highway.

Populated places in Krapina-Zagorje County